Clavogaster is a genus of gasteroid fungi in the family Agaricaceae. The genus was circumscribed by German mycologist Paul Christoph Hennings in 1896 to contain the type species Clavogaster novozelandicus, which is now a synonym of Clavogaster virescens.

See also
List of Agaricales genera
List of Agaricaceae genera

References

Agaricaceae
Agaricales genera
Taxa named by Paul Christoph Hennings